Fabbro is a surname. Notable people with the surname include:

Corrado dal Fabbro (1945–2018), Italian bobsledder
Dante Fabbro (born 1998), Canadian ice hockey player
Darío Fabbro (born 1976), retired Argentina footballer who played in the MLS
Gilberto William Fabbro (born 1977), Brazilian attacking midfielder
Joe Fabbro (1914–1978), Canadian politician
Jonathan Fabbro (born 1982), Argentine-Paraguayan football midfielder
Ronald Peter Fabbro (born 1950), Roman Catholic Bishop of London, Ontario, Canada